N-acetyl-D-glucosamine kinase is an enzyme that in humans is encoded by the NAGK gene.

Function 

N-acetylglucosamine kinase (NAGK; EC 2.7.1.59) converts endogenous N-acetylglucosamine (GlcNAc), a major component of complex carbohydrates, from lysosomal degradation or nutritional sources into GlcNAc 6-phosphate. NAGK belongs to the group of N-acetylhexosamine kinases and is a prominent salvage enzyme of amino sugar metabolism in mammals.[supplied by OMIM]

Interactions 

NAGK has been shown to interact with STK16 and LNX1.

References

Further reading 

 
 
 
 
 
 
 
 
 
 
 

Human proteins